Relu Marian Stoian (born 1 March 1996) is a Romanian professional footballer who plays as a goalkeeper for Gloria Buzău.

References

External links
 
 

1996 births
Living people
Romanian footballers
Association football goalkeepers
Nemzeti Bajnokság I players
Budapest Honvéd FC players
Liga I players
Liga II players
ASC Daco-Getica București players
Sepsi OSK Sfântu Gheorghe players
FC Gloria Buzău players
Romanian expatriate footballers
Expatriate footballers in Hungary
Romanian expatriate sportspeople in Hungary